Brian Cooper (born August 21, 1965) is a former American sprinter. He finished second in the 100 metres at the 1988 USA Outdoor Track and Field Championships, behind Emmit King, with his personal best of 10.01 seconds. In 1990, he won the 55 metres at the USA Indoor Track and Field Championships.

Born in Portsmouth, Virginia, Cooper attended McNeese State University before dropping out in 1988 to train with Carl Lewis and other sprinters in Houston.

References

External links 
 

1965 births
Living people
Sportspeople from Portsmouth, Virginia
American male sprinters
USA Indoor Track and Field Championships winners
Universiade medalists in athletics (track and field)
Universiade gold medalists for the United States
Universiade silver medalists for the United States